Indiana University Northwest (IU Northwest or IUN) is a public university in Gary, Indiana.  It is a regional campus of Indiana University and was established in 1963.

Academics
IU Northwest is located on a  campus in the northwest corner of the state. Class sizes average 30 students, and the faculty-student ratio is 1 to 14.

Programs, part- and full-time, are taught during days, evenings, and weekends, and lead to certificates and associate, bachelor's, and master's degrees. There are more than 170 full-time and more than 200 part-time faculty, more than 75% of whom have doctorates or the highest degree available in their field.

There is a network of 24,000 alumni.

College, schools, and divisions
Indiana University Northwest is organized into two colleges, two schools, two divisions, Library and Information Science, and pre-professional programs:

 College of Arts and Sciences
 College of Health and Human Services
 Containing the departments of:
 Dental Education
 Health Information Management
 School of Nursing
 School of Public and Environmental Affairs 
(the only SPEA on a regional IU campus outside of Bloomington and IUPUI)
 Radiologic Sciences
 Division of Social Work
 IU School of Medicine - Northwest
 School of Business and Economics
 School of Education
 Division of Continuing Studies
 Division of Labor Studies
 Library and Information Science
 Pre-Professional Programs
 Containing the departments of:
 Health professions
 Law

Student enrollment
In the fall of 2015, 5,848 students were enrolled at IU Northwest. Of that:

94% undergraduates and 6% graduate students
71% full-time students and 29% part-time students
69% women and 31% men
98% residents of Indiana
55% Caucasian, 19% African-American, 20% Hispanic students, 2.2% Asian and 0.2% Native American

Financial aid
US$38 million is awarded to IU Northwest students annually in the form of financial aid. 73% of IU Northwest students receive financial aid.

Athletics
The Indiana–Northwest (IU Northwest or IUN) athletic teams are called the RedHawks The university competes as a member of the National Association of Intercollegiate Athletics (NAIA), primarily competing in the Chicagoland Collegiate Athletic Conference (CCAC) since the 2019–20 academic year. The RedHawks previously competed as an NAIA Independent within the Association of Independent Institutions (AII) from 1998–99 (when the school joined the NAIA) to 2018–19.

IU Northwest (IUN) competes in nine intercollegiate varsity sports: Men's sports include basketball, cross country and soccer; while women's sports include basketball, cross country, soccer and volleyball; and co-ed sports include competitive cheer and competitive dance. Former sports included men's & women's golf and men's & women's tennis.

References

External links 
 
 Official athletics website

Northwest
Education in Gary, Indiana
Northwest Indiana
Public universities and colleges in Indiana
Education in Lake County, Indiana
Buildings and structures in Gary, Indiana
1963 establishments in Indiana